This page shows the progress of Carlisle United F.C.'s campaign in the 2012–13 football season. This season they compete in the third tier of English football, League One.

League One

Final standings

Squad statistics

|}

Injuries

Top scorers

Disciplinary record

Results

Pre-Season Friendlies

League One

FA Cup

League Cup 

Carlisle were rewarded for back to back League Cup wins at Brunton Park by entertaining Premier League giants Tottenham Hotspur in the 3rd round.

Football League Trophy

Transfers

References 

Carlisle United F.C. seasons
Carlisle United